There are at least three passages that refer to non-heterosexual sexual intercourse in the New Testament (NT), all of which are found in the Pauline epistles: Romans , 1 Corinthians , and 1 Timothy . A fourth passage, found in Jude , is often interpreted as referring to homosexuality. In the synoptic Gospels, Jesus discusses marriage only in a heterosexual context when he cites the Book of Genesis during a discussion of marriage (Mark  and Matthew ).

While it is not disputed that the three Greek words apply to sexual relations between men (and possibly between women), some academics interpret the relevant passages as a prohibition against pederasty or prostitution rather than homosexuality per se, while some scholars hold the historical position that these passages forbid all same sex sexual acts and relationships.

Homosexuality in the Pauline epistles

Romans 1:26-27

Epistle to the Romans 1:26–27 (English Majority Text Version, EMTV):

The context is Paul's mission to the gentiles, the gospel being "to the Jew first, and also to the Greek" (1:16), followed by a description of pagan idolatry in verses 1:21–25. The phrase "passions of dishonor" (KJV: "vile affections") translates ,
  meaning "dishonour, ignominy, disgrace".
In the expressions "natural use" and "contrary to nature", "nature" translates , i.e. Physis. The term "error" translates ,  (lit. "straying, wandering").

The authenticity of the passage is in doubt; scholars and theologians have proposed its being part of a larger non-Pauline interpolation. Furthermore, many contend 1:18-32 represents not Paul's own position but his summary of Hellenistic Jewish legalism. Calvin Porter, for example, concludes that "in 2:1-16, as well as through Romans as a whole, Paul, as part of his gentile mission, challenges, argues against, and refutes both the content of the discourse [of 1.18-32] and the practice of using such discourses. If that is the case then the ideas in Rom. 1.18-32 are not Paul's. They are ideas which obstruct Paul's gentile mission theology and practice."

Natural law
The authors of the New Testament had their roots in the Jewish tradition, which is commonly interpreted as prohibiting homosexuality. A more conservative biblical interpretation contends "the most authentic reading of [Romans] 1:26-27 is that which sees it prohibiting homosexual activity in the most general of terms, rather than in respect of more culturally and historically specific forms of such activity".

Several early church writers state that Romans 1:26b is a condemnation of men having unnatural sex with women. Underlying Paul's thinking is Genesis 2:22-24, "The Lord God then built the rib that he had taken from the man into a woman. When he brought her to the man, the man said: "This one, at last, is bone of my bones and flesh of my flesh; ...That is why a man leaves his father and mother and clings to his wife, and the two of them become one body." For Paul, God's intended order is for male and female sexual relationships, united in marriage. That is what he saw as natural, and therefore same sex relationships were unnatural. In 1 Romans, Paul is giving examples of what happens when people abandon God's plan.

The passage has been described by David Hilborn of the Evangelical Alliance as "the most important biblical reference for the homosexuality debate". In common with many traditional commentators, Hilborn goes on to argue that condemnation of homosexual activity is derived from the "broad contours" of Paul's argument, in addition to the selective reading of individual words or phrases.

Yale University professor John Boswell (1980) speculated that the text does not condemn "homosexual acts by homosexuals", but rather "homosexual acts committed by heterosexual persons". Boswell argues that the conceptual modality (natural laws) which would provide the basis for the condemnation of homosexuality did not exist prior to the Enlightenment era. Hays argues that Romans 1:26-27 is part of a general condemnation of humans, in which males and females, have rejected their creational (as in Genesis) distinctions, with homoeroticism being intrinsically wrong.

John J. McNeill (1993) also invokes "heterosexuals" who "abandoned heterosexuality" or "exchanged heterosexuality for homosexuality". Joe Dallas (1996), opposing what he saw as "pro-gay theology" behind such interpretations, contended that the apostle Paul is condemning changing "the natural use into that which is against nature" (Romans 1:26-27), and to suggest that Paul is referring to "heterosexuals indulging in homosexual behavior requires unreasonable mental gymnastics".

Idolatrous practices
Jeramy Townsley goes on to specify the context of Romans 1:26-27 as the continuation of Paul's condemnation of the worship of pagan gods from earlier in the chapter, linking the 'homosexuality' implied in Romans 1:27 to the practice of temple prostitution with castrated priests of Cybele, practices condemned more explicitly in the Old Testament (1 Kings 15:12, 2 Kings 23:7), the same religious group that violently attacked Paul in Ephesus, driving him from the city (Acts 19). The implication is that the goddess religions, the castrated priests and temple prostitution had a wide impact in ancient Mediterranean culture so would immediately evoke an image for the 1st-century audience of non-Yahwistic religious idolatry, practices not familiar to the modern reader, which makes it easy to misinterpret these verses. On the other hand, Brooten notes that Clement of Alexandria likely interpreted Romans 1:27 as a condemnation of lesbians. Mona West argues that Paul is condemning specific types of homosexual activity (such as temple prostitution or pederasty) rather than a broader interpretation. West argues that Paul is speaking to a gentile audience, in terms that they would understand, to show that "all have sinned and fallen short of the glory of God" (Romans 3:23).

1 Corinthians 6:9-10

The phrase "abusers of themselves with mankind" translates , also rendered "sodomites" (YLT), or "men who have sex with men" (NIV). Paul's use of the word in 1 Corinthians is the earliest example of the term; its only other usage is in a similar list of wrongdoers given (possibly by the same author) in 1 Timothy 1:8–11. Nowhere else in scripture is  used to describe a person.

These verses are a continuation of Paul's berating the Christians at Corinth for suing one another before pagan judges in Roman courts, which he sees as an infringement upon the holiness of the Christian community. Paul lists a catalogue of typical vices that exclude a person from the kingdom of God, specifically vices that the church members either practiced and would still be practicing but for the fact they were now Christians, with the express intention of showing church members that they ought to be able to settle minor disputes within the community, and above all, deal with each other charitably.

1 Timothy 1:9-10

The term relevant to homosexuality, "that defile themselves with mankind", translates , the same term for homosexuals used in 1 Corinthians. Other translations of the term include: "them that do lechery with men" (Wycliffe 1382), "those practicing homosexuality" (NIV), "those who abuse themselves with men" (Amplified Version, 1987).

Since the 19th century, many scholars have suggested that First Timothy, along with Second Timothy and Titus, are not inspired work original to Paul, but rather an unknown Christian writing some time in the late-1st to mid-2nd century. Most scholars now affirm this view.

Jude 1:7

However, scholarly debate remains open whether the transgression of Sodom and Gomorrah is rooted in homosexual actions or consistent with Genesis stories regarding Abraham's hospitality to strangers (see ).

Simon J. Kistemaker notes that the Greek phrase  ("strange flesh") is often interpreted as the specific desire on the part of the Sodomites to have sexual relations with angels.
Kistemaker, however, argues that it means they were "interested in sexual relations with men."

Words with disputed or ambiguous meanings

The Greek word  appears in 1 Corinthians 6:9 and 1 Timothy 1:10. In 1 Corinthians 6:9-10, Paul says:

The word translated as "practicing homosexuals" has been alternately rendered as "abusers of themselves with mankind" (King James Version, 21st Century King James Version), "sodomites" (Young's Literal Translation), or "homosexuals" (New American Standard Bible), "men who practice homosexuality" (English Standard Version), "those who abuse themselves with men" (Amplified Bible), "for those who have a twisted view of sex" (New International Readers Version), "for sexual perverts" (Good News Translation), "for abusers of themselves with men" (American Standard Version) or, in German and several other Northern European languages, as "pederasts." The original term is unknown before it appears in Paul's writings. Within the Bible, it only occurs in this passage and in a similar list in 1 Timothy 1:9-10.

The term is thought to be either a Jewish coinage from the Greek (Septuagint) translation of Leviticus 20:13, or even Paul's own coinage:

Arguments against a reference to homosexual behaviour
In contrast, John Boswell argues that this is a term specifically created by Paul, and that given its unusual nature, the fact that Paul did not use one of the more common pagan Greek terms, and given its direct reference to the Levitical laws, it is a matter of debate whether Paul was referring generally to any person having homosexual sex, or whether it referred only to anal sex of any form (cf. Elliott 2004). Other translations of the word, based on examinations of the context of its subsequent uses, include Dale B. Martin's (1996), who argued it meant "homosexual slave trader", and Boswell's (1980) who argued it referred to "homosexual rape" or homosexual prostitutes. Like Martin Luther, Scroggs perceives it as referring to exploitative pederasty.

The term  was rarely used in Church writings (Elliott 1994), with Townsley (2003) counting a total of 73 references.

John Boswell argues that  in 1 Corinthians 6:9 and 1 Timothy 1:10 refers specifically to male prostitution.

In his 2006 book Sex and the Single Savior, Dale B. Martin discusses examples of the word's usage outside of Paul's writings and argues that "no one knows" what it meant but that "It is certainly possible, I think probable, that  referred to a particular role of exploiting others by means of sex, perhaps but not necessarily by homosexual sex."

Arguments for a reference to homosexual behaviour
Some scholars argue the word is more against the restriction of the word to pederasty. For example, Scobie states that "there is no evidence that the term was restricted to pederasty; beyond doubt, the NT here repeats the Leviticus condemnation of all same-sex relations". Similarly, Campbell writes, "it must be pointed out, first, that  is a broad term that cannot be confined to specific instances of homosexual activity such as male prostitution or pederasty. This is in keeping with the term's Old Testament background where lying with a 'male' (a very general term) is proscribed, relating to every kind of male-male intercourse." Campbell (quoting from Wenham) goes on to say that, "in fact, the Old Testament bans every type of homosexual intercourse, not just male prostitution or intercourse with youths."

For example, according to Hays, although the word  appears nowhere in Greek literature prior to Paul's use of it, it is evidently a rendering into Greek of the standard rabbinic term for "one who lies with a male [as with a woman]" (Leviticus 18:22; 20:13). Moreover, despite recent challenges to this interpretation, the meaning is confirmed by the evidence of Sybilline Oracles 2.73. Paul here repeats the standard Jewish condemnation of homosexual conduct. Malick (op cit) writes, "it is significant that of all the terms available in the Greek language, Paul chose a compound from the Septuagint that in the broadest sense described men lying with men as they would lie with women." According to Scobie, "it clearly echoes the Greek of [Leviticus] 18:22 and 20:13 in the LXX ( = "male", and  = "bed"), so that  literally means "one who goes to bed with a male".

David Wright argues that the compound word refers to those who sleep with males, and denotes "'male homosexual activity' without qualification." Haas, reviewing the various arguments on both sides, concluded that "an examination of the biblical passages from linguistic, historical and ethical-theological perspectives fails to support the revisionist ethic and reinforces the traditional Christian teaching that homosexual practice is morally wrong." Via also agrees arsenokoitēs refers to homosexual activity. James B. De Young presents similar arguments.

Standard Greek lexicons and dictionaries understand this word as a reference to homosexual behavior.<ref>'88.280 ἀρσενοκοίτης, ου m: a male partner in homosexual intercourse—'homosexual., Louw & Nida, 'Greek-English lexicon of the New Testament: Based on semantic domains', volume 1, p. 771 (electronic ed. of the 2nd edition 1996).</ref>'a male who engages in sexual activity w. a pers. of his own sex, pederast 1 Cor 6:9 (on the impropriety of RSV's 'homosexuals' [altered to 'sodomites' NRSV] s. WPetersen, VigChr 40, '86, 187–91; cp. DWright, ibid. 41, '87, 396–98; REB's rendering of μαλακοὶ οὔτε ἀρσενοκοῖται w. the single term 'sexual pervert' is lexically unacceptable), of one who assumes the dominant role in same-sex activity, opp. μαλακός (difft. DMartin, in Biblical Ethics and Homosexuality, ed. RBrawley, '96, 117–36); 1 Ti 1:10; Pol 5:3. Cp. Ro 1:27. Romans forbade pederasty w. free boys in the Lex Scantinia, pre-Cicero (JBremmer, Arethusa 13, '80, 288 and notes); Paul's strictures against same-sex activity cannot be satisfactorily explained on the basis of alleged temple prostitution (on its rarity, but w. some evidence concerning women used for sacred prostitution at Corinth s. LWoodbury, TAPA 108, '78, 290f, esp. note 18 [lit.]), or limited to contract w. boys for homoerotic service (s. Wright, VigChr 38, '84, 125–53).', Arndt, Danker, & Bauer (eds.), 'A Greek-English Lexicon of the New Testament and Other Early Christian Literature', p. 135 (3rd ed. 2000).

Malakos

This word is translated as "male prostitutes" (NRSV), "effeminate" (NASB), or "catamites" (TJB; in the footnotes of the NKJV), in 1 Corinthians 6:9.

Arguments against a reference to homosexual behaviour
The Greek word ; malakos carries a root meaning of soft, luxurious or dainty, but here, G. Fee argues, it is used in a much darker way, possibly referring to the more passive partner in a homosexual relationship. According to Scroggs (op cit), the word malakos in Paul's list refers specifically to this category of person, the effeminate call-boy. Others, for example Olson, based on previous and subsequent uses of the term, interprets malakos to mean an effeminate but not necessarily homosexual man. Olson argues that the μαλακοί in Paul's time, "almost always referred in a negative, pejorative way to a widely despised group of people who functioned as effeminate 'call boys'."

Dale B. Martin argues that "it would never have occurred to an ancient person to think that  or any other word indicating the feminine in itself referred to homosexual sex at all. It could just as easily refer to heterosexual sex."

Arguments for a reference to homosexual behaviour
Lexical evidence from Greek texts indicates the word was used to refer to the passive partner in a male homosexual act. For example, Malick (op cit) writes that a significant expression of this usage is found in a letter from Demophon, a wealthy Egyptian, to Ptolemaeus, a police official, concerning needed provisions for a coming festival. According to Ukleja, "a strong possible translation of both malakos (and arsenokoitēs) is the morally loose (effeminate) who allow themselves to be used homosexually and the person who is a practicing homosexual." Ukleja cites a number of classical Greek sources in support his assertion.

The meaning of the word is not confined to male prostitutes. According to Malick (op cit), when malakos is employed in reference to sexual relationships of men with men, it is not a technical term for male call-boys in a pederastic setting. The term may mean effeminate with respect to boys or men who take the role of a woman in homosexual relationships. Nor is the meaning of the word confined to sexually exploited males.

Standard Greek lexicons and dictionaries understand this word as a reference to the passive partner in a male homosexual act.The vice catalog of 1 Cor 6:9 mentions the μαλακοί, soft people / weaklings, as reprehensible examples of passive homosexuality (cf. Rom 1:27; Lev 20:13; Ep. Arist. 152; Sib. Or. 3:184ff., 584ff.; see Billerbeck III, 70; H. Conzelmann, 1 Cor [Hermeneia] ad loc. [bibliography]).', Balz & Schneider, 'Exegetical Dictionary of the New Testament', volume 2, p. 381 (1990).'88.281 μαλακόςb, οῦ m: the passive male partner in homosexual intercourse—'homosexual.' For a context of μαλακόςb, see 1 Cor 6:9–10 in 88.280. As in Greek, a number of other languages also have entirely distinct terms for the active and passive roles in homosexual intercourse.', Louw & Nida, 'Greek-English lexicon of the New Testament: Based on semantic domains', volume 1, p. 771-772 (electronic ed. of the 2nd edition 1996).'3120. μαλακός malakós; fem. malakḗ, neut. malakón, adj. Soft to the touch, spoken of clothing made of soft materials, fine texture (Matt. 11:8; Luke 7:25). Figuratively it means effeminate or a person who allows himself to be sexually abused contrary to nature. Paul, in 1 Cor. 6:9, joins the malakoí, the effeminate, with arsenokoítai (733), homosexuals, Sodomites.', Zodhiates, 'The Complete Word Study Dictionary: New Testament' (electronic ed. 2000). Most scholars think it means someone wilfully engaged in homosexual relations.

Some theologians have argued that, when read in historical context, the Jewish Platonist philosopher Philo of Alexandria used the term in reference to temple prostitution.

According to Roy Ward, malakos was used to describe an item soft to the touch, such as a soft pillow or cloth. When used negatively, the term meant faint-hearted, lacking in self-control, weak or morally weak with no link to same-gender sexual behaviour.

Porneia

In Matthew 15: 19-20 (KJV) Jesus says:

In Mark 7: 20-23 (KJV) it says:

Translations of these passages generally translate  as fornication rather than sexual impurity (see Leviticus). Some interpret the translation of  more broadly, to encompass sexual immorality in general, though there is disagreement over whether such an interpretation is supported by the writings of the Church Fathers.

Pais

This event is referred to in both Matthew 8:5-13 and Luke 7:1-10 and tells of Jesus healing a centurion's servant. Luke 7:2 (TNIV) says: "There a centurion's servant, whom his master valued highly, was sick and about to die."

Horner and Daniel A. Helminiak both suggest a homosexual theme to this text. Helminiak argues that this is implied by the broader context of the narrative suggesting an unusual level of concern about the servant, whereas Horner suggests that use of the term "valued highly" implies a sexual relationship. Horner goes on to argue that, as Jesus commended the centurion for his faith (Matthew 8:10; Luke 7:9), it shows that Jesus approved of their relationship, otherwise he would have condemned him. However, a contrasting viewpoint is that the term "highly valued" simply suggests a genuine care for the person or, more archaically, that the centurion was fond of this slave, and that the term  has no hint of sexual content in any of its various appearances in the Bible. Jay Michaelson argues that the term pais is actually mistranslated as servant when its true meaning is lover.

Other biblical scholars dismiss any suggestions of a homosexual theme as deliberately distorted interpretations of the text.Marston, P. (2003) Christians, Gays and Gay Christians. Free Methodists. Marston argues that Jesus would not have condoned any homosexual relationship, in line with the weight of other scriptural evidence, while Chapman suggests that even if the relationship had been homosexual, his lack of condemnation does not necessarily equate to his approval of them.

Other issues of sexuality
Eunuchs
In Matthew 19:12, Jesus discusses eunuchs who were born as such, eunuchs who were made so by others, and eunuchs who choose to live as such for the kingdom of heaven. Clement of Alexandria wrote in his commentary on it that "some men, from their birth, have a natural sense of repulsion from a woman; and those who are naturally so constituted do well not to marry". The select 144,000 referenced in the heavenly vision of John in Revelation 14:4 are "the ones who have not been defiled with women...they are the ones who follow the Lamb wherever He goes...these have been purchased from among men as first fruits to God and the Lamb. And no lie was found in their mouth; they are blameless."

The First Council of Nicaea in 325 AD established 20 new laws called canons.  The first of these was the prohibition of self castration.

The Ethiopian eunuch, an early gentile convert encountered in Acts 8, has been described as an early gay Christian, based on the fact that the word "eunuch" in the Bible was not always used literally, as in Matthew 19:12.

Female homosexuality
In the Epistle to the Romans 1:26-27 (ESV), Paul writes, "For this reason God gave them up to dishonorable passions. For their women exchanged natural relations for those that are contrary to nature". This is the only known specific reference in the Bible to female homosexuality. Most interpreters assume that, due to the analogy with same-sex lust between males, Paul is referring to female same-sex behavior. This assumption is not conclusive, and it remains difficult to discern exactly what Paul meant by women exchanging natural intercourse for unnatural.

Brooten cites both Anastasios and Augustine as explicitly rejecting the 'lesbian hypothesis' (p. 337). Hanks asserts that "not until John Chrysostom (ca 400 CE) does anyone (mis)interpret Romans 1:26 as referring to relations between two women" (p. 90). Townsley notes that other early writers, possibly including Chrysostom, reject the 'lesbian' hypothesis, specifically, Ambrosiaster, Didymus the Blind and Clement of Alexandria.

Developmental sexuality
Thomas E. Schmidt's dictionary entry on the topic concludes that a process of spirituality and sexuality are developmental in the life of Christian believers and proper instruction is towards "a growth in discipleship" rather than self-identity.

Historical and cultural perspectives

The history of Christianity and homosexuality has been much debated. The Hebrew Bible/Old Testament and its traditional interpretations in Judaism and Christianity have historically affirmed and endorsed a patriarchal and heteronormative approach towards human sexuality, favouring exclusively penetrative vaginal intercourse between men and women within the boundaries of marriage over all other forms of human sexual activity, including autoeroticism, masturbation, oral sex, non-penetrative and non-heterosexual sexual intercourse (all of which have been labeled as "sodomy" at various times), believing and teaching that such behaviors are forbidden because they're considered sinful, and further compared to or derived from the behavior of the alleged residents of Sodom and Gomorrah. However, the status of LGBT people in early Christianity is debated. Throughout the majority of Christian history, most Christian theologians and denominations have considered homosexual behavior as immoral or sinful.

Many commentators have argued that the references to homosexuality in the New Testament, or the Bible in general, have to be understood in their proper historical context. Indeed, most interpreters come to the text with a preconceived notion of what the Bible has to say about normative sexual behaviors, influencing subsequent interpretations. For example, William Walker says that the very notion of "homosexuality" (or even "heterosexuality", "bisexuality" and "sexual orientation") is essentially a modern concept that would simply have been unintelligible to the New Testament writers. The word "homosexuality" and the concept of sexual orientation as being separate from one's perceived masculinity or femininity (i.e. gender identity) did not take shape until the 19th century. Moreover, although some ancient Romans (i.e. doctors, astrologers, etc.) discussed congenital inclinations to unconventional sexual activities such as homosexuality, this classification fails to correspond to a modern psychological, biological and genetic distinction between homosexual, heterosexual and bisexual orientations. However, according to Gagnon, the concept of homosexual orientation was not wholly unknown in the Greco-Roman milieu. Moreover, he asserts that there is absolutely no evidence that modern orientation theory would have had any impact on Paul changing his strong negative valuation of homosexual practice.

A statement by the Bishops of the Church of England ("Issues in Human Sexuality") in 1991 illustrates a categorization and understanding of homosexuality, claiming that in ancient times "society recognized the existence of those, predominantly male, who appeared to be attracted entirely to members of their own sex." ("Issues in Human Sexuality" para 2.16, lines 8-9) which almost parallels that of modern ideation. The same study is careful to point out that "the modern concept of orientation has been developed against a background of genetic and psychological theory which was not available to the ancient world."

Sarah Ruden, in her Paul Among the People'' (2010) argues that the only form of homosexual sex that was apparent to the public in Paul's time was exploitative pederasty, in which slave boys were raped by adult males, often very violently. Paul's condemnation of homosexuality, Ruden argues, can be interpreted most plausibly as a criticism of this kind of brutally exploitative behavior.

See also
The Bible and homosexuality

Notes

References

LGBT and Christianity
Religious law
Bible-related controversies